Henry Blunt may refer to:

Henry Blunt (priest) (1794–1843), English Anglican evangelical cleric
Sir Henry Blunt, 2nd Baronet (1696–1759), of the Blunt baronets
Henry Blunt, founder of University of West Los Angeles
Henry Blunt (chemist) (1806–1853), English chemist and painter

See also
John Henry Blunt (1823–1884), English divine
Henry Blount (disambiguation) (often pronounced Blunt)
Blunt (surname)